Castañeda is a surname.

Castañeda or Castaneda may also refer to:
 Castaneda (band) an American Indie Pop band 
 La Castañeda, a Mexican rock band
 Castañeda, Cantabria, a municipality in Cantabria, Spain
 Castaneda, Switzerland, a municipality in the district of Moesa, Graubünden canton, Switzerland
 Dr. Carlos Castañeda Elementary School, a school in McAllen, Texas, USA

See also
 Alfonso Castañeda, Nueva Vizcaya, a municipality in Nueva Vizcaya province, the Philippines
 Perry–Castañeda Library, a library of the University of Texas Austin